Yellowstone Falls consist of two major waterfalls on the Yellowstone River, within Yellowstone National Park, Wyoming, United States. As the Yellowstone river flows north from Yellowstone Lake, it leaves the Hayden Valley and plunges first over Upper Yellowstone Falls and then a quarter mile (400 m) downstream over Lower Yellowstone Falls, at which point it then enters the Grand Canyon of the Yellowstone, which is up to 1,000 feet (304 m) deep.

Upper Yellowstone Falls
The upper falls are 109 feet (33 m) high. The brink of the upper falls marks the junction between a hard rhyolite lava flow and weaker glassy lava that has been more heavily eroded.

Lower Yellowstone Falls
Cascading from the 590,000 year old Canyon Rhyolite lava flow, Lower Yellowstone Falls is the largest volume waterfall in the Rocky Mountains of the United States.

History
It is likely that Native American tribes knew of the falls for centuries.  Captain William Clark of the Lewis and Clark Expedition made a note in his journal about hearing of the falls but did not believe the story.  The first European to see the falls was likely French fur trapper Baptise Ducharme who claimed to see the falls in 1824, 1826 and 1839. Jim Bridger and fellow explorer James Gremmell claimed they visited the falls in 1846.  In 1851, Bridger provided missionary Father Pierre-Jean De Smet a map showing the location of the falls.  The Cook–Folsom–Peterson Expedition, a private group of three explorers named the falls in 1869.  The earliest images of the falls were drawn by Private Charles Moore, a member of the U.S. Army escort of the Washburn-Langford-Doane Expedition which explored the Yellowstone River in August–September 1870.  During the Hayden Expedition of 1871, the falls were documented in photographs by William Henry Jackson and later in paintings by Thomas Moran.  In January 1887, Frank Jay Haynes took the first winter photographs of the lower falls.

Over the years the estimates of the height of Lower Falls has varied dramatically. In 1851 Jim Bridger estimated its height at 250 feet. One outrageous newspaper story from 1867 placed its height at "thousands of feet". A map from 1869 gives the falls its current name of Lower Falls for the first time and estimates the height at 350 feet.
However the current map lists the Lower Falls at a height of 308 feet.

Viewing the falls
Today, there are numerous vantage points for viewing the falls. The Canyon loop road skirts the west side of the canyon with several vehicle parking areas. One trail leads down to the brink of the lower falls, a steep third of a mile (600 m). Uncle Tom's Trail descends from the east down a series of stairs attached to the cliffs.

The Lower Falls area is located just to the south and east of Canyon Village in Yellowstone National Park. A one-way loop drive starting south from Canyon Junction takes one to the brink of the Grand Canyon of the Yellowstone and offers four viewpoints, with the first stop at the trail that leads to the top of the Lower Falls. The one-way drive continues east and north past the other viewpoints, rejoining the main Grand Loop road from the east at Canyon Junction once more.

Image Gallery

See also
 List of waterfalls in Yellowstone National Park

Notes

External links
 
 Video of Lower Falls (1899) - Thomas Edison, Library of Congress

Landforms of Park County, Wyoming
Waterfalls of Yellowstone National Park
Waterfalls of Wyoming
Tourist attractions in Park County, Wyoming
Tiered waterfalls
Articles containing video clips
Falls